"Jayden" Yuan Xiaochao (born 7 August 1988) is a retired professional wushu taolu athlete and actor from China. He was a world champion in 2005 and 2007.

Career

Competitive wushu 
Yuan started to practice martial arts in Songjiang Martial Arts School in 1998 and later joined the Shanxi Provincial Wushu Team.

Yuan's international debut was at the 2005 East Asian Games where he won a bronze medal in changquan. He then appeared at the 2005 World Wushu Championships and was the world champion in changquan. Later in the year, he competed in the 2005 National Games of China and won the gold medal in men's daoshu and gunshu combined. Yuan then competed in the 2006 Asian Games and won the gold medal in men's changquan all-around. He then was a world champion once again in changquan at the 2007 World Wushu Championships. This qualified him for the 2008 Beijing Wushu Tournament where he won the gold medal in men's changquan. He won yet another gold medal in men's changquan at the 2009 World Games. Yuan then competed in the 2009 National Games of China and was a double silver medalist in changquan and daoshu/gunshu combined. His last international competition was at the 2010 Asian Games where he won the gold medal in men's changquan.

Acting 
After retiring from competitive wushu taolu, he adopted the first-name "Jayden." He starred in Tai Chi 0 (2012) and its sequel Tai Chi Hero (2012).

Personal life 
Yuan's uncles include Yuan Wenqing and Yuan Xindong, both of which were also members of the Shanxi wushu team.

See also 

 List of Asian Games medalists in wushu
China national wushu team

References

External links 

 
Athlete Profile at the 2008 Beijing Wushu Tournament

1988 births
Living people
Male actors from Shandong
Chinese martial artists
Chinese wushu practitioners
21st-century Chinese male actors
Chinese male film actors
Wushu practitioners at the 2006 Asian Games
Wushu practitioners at the 2010 Asian Games
Medalists at the 2006 Asian Games
Medalists at the 2010 Asian Games
Asian Games gold medalists for China
Asian Games medalists in wushu
World Games gold medalists
Competitors at the 2008 Beijing Wushu Tournament
World Games medalists in wushu